Cheriyanad is a village in Kerala state of India. It lies in the Central Travancore Region, and specifically comes under Chengannur taluk in Alappuzha District.

History

The west half of Cheriyanad village was once located on the boundary of the Kingdom of the Kayamkulam Raja and the east half on the boundary of Pandalam Kingdom of Pandalam raja. In 1746 along with the rest of the kingdom it was annexed to Travancore. Cheriyanad possesses a Padanilam or a battlefield which is now used by the Cheriyanad temple for festivals. There was a Shastha temple Situvated in Cheriyanad Padanilam. The Padanilam is also known as  "Shastham  Kunnu". The centre of Padanilam  was known as otha varambu. Until the 1980s, there were two "Kalithattu" (a raised square platform fortified with four heavy stones at the borders). During temple festivals the "Pallivilakku"  (High rise wooden raths with lighted lamps) from each Kara are brought to the ground.

Traditionally, Cheriyanad consisted of nine original Karas or villages which are now: Athimanchery, Edavankadu, Mandapariyaram, Thuruthimel, Moolikode, Edamuri, Mampra, Arayinnurshery, and Alakode ( cheruvalloor& Kollakadavu ). For administrative purposes it is subdivided into 14 Karas. Cheriyanad is home to an important Temple (Cheriyanad Temple). The heart of Cheriyanad known as Athimunchery, and is known locally as Cheriyanad.

Rail and Road Access

Cheriyanad is 7 km from the town of Chengannur and the same distance to the town of Mavelikkara. Cheriyanad has its own minor railway station besides is just  7 km far away from Chengannur railway station and 8 km from mavelikara railway station.

References

Villages in Alappuzha district